Glenn Jagodzinske (born April 5, 1947) is a former American football and track and field coach. He served as the head football coach at Huron College—later known as Huron University—in Huron, South Dakota from 1975 to 1977, Westmar University in Le Mars, Iowa from 1978 to 1980, and Washburn University in Topeka, Kansas, from 1981 to 1982, and compiling college football coaching record of 36–41–1.

Jagodzinske lettered for four years on the football team at Westmar College—later known as Westmar University—in Le Mars, Iowa before graduating in 1969. He began his coaching career as football and track mentor at Hubbard High School in Hubbard, Iowa. Jagodzinske moved to Sheldon High School in Sheldon, Iowa, where he served as head football coach.

Head coaching record

College football

References

1947 births
Living people
Huron Screaming Eagles football coaches
Washburn Ichabods football coaches
Westmar Eagles football coaches
Westmar Eagles football players
College track and field coaches in the United States
High school football coaches in Iowa
High school track and field coaches in the United States